The University Grants Commission Act, 1956 is an Act of the Parliament of India. The Act is sometimes referred to as "the UGC Act".

References

Acts of the Parliament of India 1956
University-related legislation
1956 in education